The following bibliography of Aldous Huxley provides a chronological list of the published works of English writer Aldous Huxley (1894–1963). It includes his fiction and non-fiction, both published during his lifetime and posthumously.

Huxley was a writer and philosopher. He wrote nearly fifty books—both novels and non-fiction works—as well as wide-ranging essays, narratives, and poems. Born into the prominent Huxley family, he graduated from Balliol College, Oxford with an undergraduate degree in English literature. Early in his career, he published short stories and poetry and edited the literary magazine Oxford Poetry, before going on to publish travel writing, satire, and screenplays. He spent the latter part of his life in the United States, living in Los Angeles from 1937 until his death. By the end of his life, Huxley was widely acknowledged as one of the foremost intellectuals of his time. He was nominated for the Nobel Prize in Literature nine times and was elected Companion of Literature by the Royal Society of Literature in 1962.

Huxley was a humanist and pacifist. He grew interested in philosophical mysticism and universalism, addressing these subjects with works such as The Perennial Philosophy (1945)—which illustrates commonalities between Western and Eastern mysticism—and The Doors of Perception (1954)—which interprets his own psychedelic experience with mescaline. In his most famous novel Brave New World (1932) and his final novel Island (1962), he presented his vision of dystopia and utopia, respectively.

Books

Fiction

Novels
 Crome Yellow (1921)
 Antic Hay (1923)
 Those Barren Leaves (1925)
 Point Counter Point (1928)
 Brave New World (1932)
 Eyeless in Gaza (1936)
 After Many a Summer (1939)
 Time Must Have a Stop (1944)
 Ape and Essence (1948)
 The Genius and the Goddess (1955)
 Island (1962)

Short story collections
 Limbo (1920)
 Mortal Coils (1922)
 Little Mexican and Other Stories (1924) 
 Two or Three Graces and Other Stories (1926)
 Brief Candles (1930)
 Collected Short Stories (1944)
 Jacob's Hands: A Fable 
 After the Fireworks: Three Novellas (2016)

Children's fiction
 The Crows of Pearblossom (1967)

Non-fiction
 They Still Draw Pictures: A collection of 60 drawings made by Spanish children during the war (1938), The Spanish Child Welfare Association (Huxley as illustrator)
 Grey Eminence: A Study in Religion and Politics (1941)
 The Art of Seeing: An Adventure in Re-education (1942) 
 The Perennial Philosophy (1945)
 The Devils of Loudun (1953)
 Selected Letters (2007)

Essay collections
 On the Margin: Notes and Essays (1923)
 Essays New and Old (1926)
 Proper Studies: The Proper Study of Mankind Is Man (1927)
 Do What You Will (1929) (full text)
 Holy Face and Other Essays (1929)
 Vulgarity in Literature: Digressions from a Theme (1930)
 Music at Night and Other Essays (1931)
 Texts and Pretexts: An Anthology with Commentaries (1932)
 The Olive Tree and Other Essays (1936) (full text)
 Ends and Means: An Enquiry into the Nature of Ideals and the Methods Employed for their Realization (1937) Reissued by Transaction Publishers (2012), with a new introduction "Pacifism and Non-Attachment" by Howard G. Schneiderman
 Words and their Meanings (1940)
 Science, Liberty and Peace (1946)
 Themes and Variations (1950)
 The Doors of Perception (1954)
 Heaven and Hell (1956)
 Adonis and the Alphabet and Other Essays (1956) 
 Collected Essays (1958)
 Brave New World Revisited (1958)
 On Art and Artists: Literature, Painting, Architecture, Music (1960)
 Literature and Science (1963)

 Moksha: Writings on Psychedelics and the Visionary Experience 1931–63 (1977)
 The Human Situation: Lectures at Santa Barbara, 1959 (1977)

Pamphlets
 Pacifism and Philosophy (1935)
 1936 . . . PEACE? (1936)
 What Are You Going to Do about It?: The Case for Constructive Peace (1936)
 An Encyclopedia of Pacifism (1937)  (full text)
 The Most Agreeable Vice (1938)
 The Politics of Ecology: The Question of Survival (1963)

Travel books
 Along the Road: Notes and Essays of a Tourist (1925)
 Jesting Pilate: The Diary of a Journey (1926)
 Beyond the Mexique Bay : A Traveller's Journey (1934)

Poetry collections
 Oxford Poetry (1916) 
 The Burning Wheel (1916)
 Jonah (1917)
 The Defeat of Youth and Other Poems (1918)
 Leda (1920)
 Selected Poems (1925)
 Arabia Infelix and Other Poems (1929)
 The Cicadas and Other Poems (1931)
 The Collected Poetry of Aldous Huxley (1971)

Screenplays
 Pride and Prejudice (1940) 
 Madame Curie (1943) 
 Jane Eyre (1943) 
 A Woman's Vengeance (1947)
 Original screenplay (rejected) for Disney's animated Alice in Wonderland (1951)

Drama
 The Discovery (1924) 
 The World of Light: A Comedy in Three Acts (1931) (full text)
 Mortal Coils – A Play (1948) 
 The Genius and the Goddess (1958) 
 The Ambassador of Captripedia (1967)
 Now More Than Ever (2000)

Articles written for Vedanta and the West

 "Distractions" (1941)
 "Distractions II" (1941)
 "Action and Contemplation" (1941)
 "An Appreciation" (1941)
 "The Yellow Mustard" (1941)
 "Lines" (1941)
 "Some Reflections of the Lord's Prayer" (1941)
 "Reflections of the Lord's Prayer" (1942)
 "Reflections of the Lord's Prayer II" (1942)
 "Words and Reality" (1942)
 "Readings in Mysticism" (1942)
 "Man and Reality" (1942)
 "The Magical and the Spiritual" (1942)
 "Religion and Time" (1943)
 "Idolatry" (1943)
 "Religion and Temperament" (1943)
 "A Note on the Bhagavatam" (1943)
 "Seven Meditations" (1943)
 "On a Sentence From Shakespeare" (1944)
 "The Minimum Working Hypothesis" (1944)
 "From a Notebook" (1944)
 "The Philosophy of the Saints" (1944)
 "That Art Thou" (1945)
 "That Art Thou II" (1945)
 "The Nature of the Ground" (1945)

 "The Nature of the Ground II" (1945)
 "God in the World" (1945)
 "Origins and Consequences of Some Contemporary Thought-Patterns" (1946)
 "The Sixth Patriarch" (1946)
 "Some Reflections on Time" (1946)
 "Reflections on Progress" (1947)
 "Further Reflections on Progress" (1947)
 "William Law" (1947)
 "Notes on Zen" (1947)
 "Give Us This Day Our Daily Bread" (1948)
 "A Note on Gandhi" (1948)
 "Art and Religion" (1949)
 "Foreword to an Essay on the Indian Philosophy of Peace" (1950)
 "A Note on Enlightenment" (1952)
 "Substitutes for Liberation" (1952)
 "The Desert" (1954)
 "A Note on Patanjali" (1954)
 "Who Are We?" (1955)
 "Foreword to the Supreme Doctrine" (1956)
 "Knowledge and Understanding" (1956)
 "The 'Inanimate' is Alive" (1957)
 "Symbol and Immediate Experience" (1960)

Audio recordings
 Knowledge and Understanding (1955), A lecture given at the Hollywood Temple of the Vedanta Society of Southern California
 Who Are We? (1955), A lecture given at the Hollywood Temple of the Vedanta Society of Southern California

References

 
Bibliographies by writer
Bibliographies of English writers